TinkerTool is a freeware application for macOS that allows the user to customise the system by exposing hidden preferences to a graphical user interface (GUI). It is developed by German developer Marcel Bresink Software-Systeme. Its latest release is version 8.2, which is optimised for macOS BS and many features that came with it.

Features
TinkerTool gives users access to hidden system and application preferences that Apple has built into macOS, but not integrated into GUI preferences menus. Although users can typically access these through Terminal operations, TinkerTool assembles them and provides a GUI similar to Apple’s System Preferences application for easier access.

By using Apple’s hidden preferences, the application only commits changes that are reversible and affect the preferences of the current user account. Administrative privileges or background processing are not required. The application also supports a reset option to reset all preferences to Apple's defaults, or to the state that existed before using the application.

History
Initially, TinkerTool worked with all versions of macOS. However, over the years, compatibility with particular versions of macOS was spun off into separate applications: TinkerTool Classic, TinkerTool Classic Generation 2, TinkerTool 4, TinkerTool 5, TinkerTool 6, and the current TinkerTool. Support therefore goes back to Mac OS X 10.1 Puma and later.

Versions 
TinkerTool versions are specific to versions of macOS and are not backward compatible. The program will not work correctly if used with an OS for which it was not designed.

 Mac OS X 10.2 Jaguar: TinkerTool Classic, v3.9.5
 Mac OS X 10.3 Panther: TinkerTool Classic, v3.9.5
 Mac OS X 10.4 Tiger: TinkerTool Classic Generation 2, v4.5
 Mac OS X 10.5 Leopard: TinkerTool Classic Generation 2, v4.5
 Mac OS X 10.6 Snow Leopard: TinkerTool 4, v4.97
 Mac OS X 10.7 Lion: TinkerTool 4, v4.97
 OS X 10.8 Mountain Lion: TinkerTool 4, v4.97
 OS X 10.9 Mavericks: TinkerTool 5, v5.7
 OS X 10.10 Yosemite: TinkerTool 5, v5.7
 OS X 10.11 El Capitan: TinkerTool 5, v5.7
 macOS 10.12 Sierra: TinkerTool 6, v6.5
 macOS 10.13 High Sierra: TinkerTool 6, v6.5
macOS 10.14 Mojave:  TinkerTool, v7.4.2
macOS 10.15 Catalina: TinkerTool, v7.4.2
macOS 11.1 Big Sur: TinkerTool, v8.0.0

The macOS Big Sur (11.1) build is actively maintained. However, all previous versions in support of past operating systems are still available for download from the developer's website.

See also
 OnyX

References

External links 
 

Utilities for macOS